There are over 20,000 Grade II* listed buildings in England. This page is a list of these buildings in the county of West Sussex, by former districts prior to the 2009 structural changes to local government in England.

Adur

|}

Arun

|}

Chichester

|}

Crawley

|}

Horsham

|}

Mid Sussex

|}

Worthing

|}

Notes

References 
National Heritage List for England

External links

 
West Sussex
Lists of listed buildings in West Sussex